United States Barracuda-class submarine may refer to:
 United States Barracuda-class submarine (1919)
 United States Barracuda-class submarine (1951)